("Okinawa IC Card") is a contactless transportation card used in Okinawa's public transportation system.

Overview
OKICA was the first contactless public transportation card in Okinawa Prefecture.

The card is maintained and administered by Okinawa IC Co., Ltd., a public corporation created for the purpose of overseeing the card's use. The OKICA sold over 130,000 units during its introductory year and a half. There is a utilization goal (on Yui Rail) of 60% by 2024. The card expires 10 years after last charge or use of card.

Usage 
The OKICA is used by the Okinawa Urban Monorail (Yui Rail), and four major bus operators within the main island of Okinawa (Ryukyu Bus Kotsu, Okinawa Bus, Naha Bus, and Toyo Bus). It was introduced on October 20, 2014 for Yui Rail and was then simultaneously introduced for all four bus companies on  April 27, 2015.

The card is compatible with other IC cards in Japan (such as SUGOCA or Suica) since 10 March 2020, but cannot be used outside Okinawa prefecture. Currently, it cannot be used for other transport services such as taxis or ferries, but feasibility studies have been conducted.

References

External links 
  Official website

Fare collection systems in Japan
Contactless smart cards